GQ (formerly Gentlemen's Quarterly and Apparel Arts) is an American international monthly men's magazine based in New York City and founded in 1931. The publication focuses on fashion, style, and culture for men, though articles on food, movies, fitness, sex, music, travel, celebrities' sports, technology, and books are also featured.

History 

Gentlemen's Quarterly was launched in 1931 in the United States as Apparel Arts. It was a men's fashion magazine for the clothing trade, aimed primarily at wholesale buyers and retail sellers. Initially it had a very limited print run and was aimed solely at industry insiders to enable them to give advice to their customers. The popularity of the magazine among retail customers, who often took the magazine from the retailers, spurred the creation of Esquire magazine in 1933.

Apparel Arts continued until 1957 when it was transformed into a quarterly magazine for men, which was published for many years by Esquire Inc. Apparel was dropped from the logo in 1958 with the spring issue after nine issues, and the name Gentlemen's Quarterly was established.

Gentlemen's Quarterly was re-branded as GQ in 1967. The rate of publication was increased from quarterly to monthly in 1970. In 1979 Condé Nast bought the publication, and editor Art Cooper changed the course of the magazine, introducing articles beyond fashion and establishing GQ as a general men's magazine in competition with Esquire. 

Subsequently, international editions were launched as regional adaptations of the U.S. editorial formula. Jim Nelson was named editor-in-chief of GQ in February 2003; during his tenure, he worked as both a writer and an editor of several National Magazine Award-nominated pieces, and the magazine became more oriented towards younger readers and those who prefer a more casual style.

Nonnie Moore was hired by GQ as fashion editor in 1984, having served in the same position at Mademoiselle and Harper's Bazaar. Jim Moore, the magazine's fashion director at the time of her death in 2009, described the choice as unusual, observing that "She was not from men's wear, so people said she was an odd choice, but she was actually the perfect choice". Jim Moore also noted that she changed the publication's more casual look: "She helped dress up the pages, as well as dress up the men, while making the mix more exciting and varied and approachable for men."

GQ has been closely associated with metrosexuality. The writer Mark Simpson coined the term in an article for British newspaper The Independent about his visit to a GQ exhibition in London: "The promotion of metrosexuality was left to the men's style press, magazines such as The Face, GQ, Esquire, Arena and FHM, the new media which took off in the Eighties and is still growing ... They filled their magazines with images of narcissistic young men sporting fashionable clothes and accessories. 

And they persuaded other young men to study them with a mixture of envy and desire." The magazine has expanded its coverage beyond lifestyle issues. For example, in 2003, journalist Sabrina Erdely wrote an eight-page feature story in GQ on famous con man Steve Comisar. GQ has been called the "holy text of woke capital" by The Spectator.

In 2016, GQ launched the spinoff quarterly GQ Style, headed by then-style editor Will Welch, who was later promoted to creative director of the magazine.

In 2018, writing for GQ, Rachel Kaadzi Ghansah won the Pulitzer Prize for Feature Writing for her article about Dylann Roof, who had shot nine African-Americans in a church in Charleston. In September 2018, Will Welch was named the new editor-in-chief of GQ, succeeding Jim Nelson.

Men of the Year 
GQ (U.S.) first named their Men of the Year in 1996, featuring the award recipients in a special issue of the magazine. British GQ launched its annual Men of the Year awards in 2009 and GQ India launched its version the following year. Spanish GQ launched its Men of the Year awards in 2011 and GQ Australia launched its version in 2007.

Controversies

Glee controversy 
In 2010, GQ magazine had three adult members of the television show Glee (Dianna Agron, Lea Michele and Cory Monteith) partake in a photoshoot. The sexualization of the actresses in the photos caused controversy among parents of teens who watch the show Glee. The Parents Television Council was the first to react to the photo spread when it was leaked prior to GQ's planned publishing date. Their President Tim Winter stated, "By authorizing this kind of near-pornographic display, the creators of the program have established their intentions on the show's directions. And it isn't good for families". The photoshoot was published as planned and Dianna Agron went on to state that the photos did push the envelope, that they did not represent who she is any more than other magazine photo shoots, but that she was a 24-year-old adult in the photo shoot, and wondered why the concerned parents allowed their eight year old daughters to read any racy issue of the adult magazine GQ.

Russian apartment bombings 
GQs September 2009 U.S. magazine published, in its "backstory" section, an article by Scott Anderson, "None Dare Call It Conspiracy". Before GQ published the article, an internal email from a Condé Nast lawyer referred to it as "Vladimir Putin's Dark Rise to Power". The article reported Anderson's investigation of the 1999 Russian apartment bombings, and included interviews with Mikhail Trepashkin who investigated the bombings while he was a colonel in Russia's Federal Security Service.

The story, including Trepashkin's own findings, contradicted the Russian Government's official explanation of the bombings and criticized Vladimir Putin, the President of Russia.

Condé Nast's management tried to keep the story out of Russia. It ordered executives and editors not to distribute that issue in Russia or show it to "Russian government officials, journalists or advertisers". Management decided not to publish the story on GQs website or in Condé Nast's foreign magazines, not to publicize the story, and asked Anderson not to syndicate the story "to any publications that appear in Russia".

The day after the magazine's publication in the United States, bloggers published the original English text and a translation into Russian on the internet.

Criticism of the Bible and Western literary canon 

On April 19, 2018, the editors of GQ published an article titled "21 Books You Don't Have to Read" in which the editors compiled a list of works they think are overrated and should be passed over, including the Bible as well as Catcher in the Rye, The Alchemist, Blood Meridian, A Farewell to Arms, The Old Man and the Sea, The Lord of the Rings, and Catch-22. The article generated a backlash among Internet commentators.

Circulation 
The magazine reported an average worldwide paid circulation of 934,000 in the first half of 2019, down 1.1% from 944,549 in 2016 and 2.6% from 958,926 in 2015.

According to the Audit Bureau of Circulations (UK), British GQ had an average circulation of 103,087 during the first half of 2019, down 6.3% from 110,063 during the second half of 2018, and down 10.3% from 114,867 during the second half of 2013.

Editors and publishers 

U.S. publishers
 Bernard J. Miller (1957–1975)
 Sal Schiliro (1975–1980)
 Steve Florio (1975–1985)
 Jack Kliger (1985–1988)
 Michael Clinton (1988–1994)
 Michael Perlis (1994–1995)
 Richard Beckman (1995–1999)
 Tom Florio (1999–2000)
 Ronald A. Galotti (2000–2003)
 Peter King Hunsinger (2003–2011)
 Chris Mitchell (2011–2014)
 Howard Mittman (2014–2017)

U.S. editors
 Everett Mattlin (1957–1969)
 Jack Haber (1969–1983)
 Art Cooper (1983–2003)
 Jim Nelson (2003–2019)
 Will Welch (2019–present)

U.K. editors
 Paul Keers (1988–1990)
 Alexandra Shulman (1990–1992)
 Michael VerMeulen (1992–1995)
 James Brown (1997–1999)
 Tom Haines (1999)
 Dylan Jones (1999–2021)
 Adam Baidawi (2021-present)

See also 
 List of men's magazines
 Men's Vogue
 List of people on the cover of GQ
 List of people on the cover of GQ Russia

References

External links 

 

1957 establishments in the United States
Fashion magazines published in the United States
Men's magazines published in the United States
Monthly magazines published in the United States
Condé Nast magazines
GQ
Magazines established in 1957
Magazines published in New York City
Men's fashion magazines